According to Iranian authorities, Iranian underground missile bases or silos, also known as the Missile Cities exist in all provinces and cities of Iran. The bases contain road-mobile transporter erector launcher trucks, along with other hardware. A video from one of the missile sites was released for the first time on 14 October 2015 by Brigadier General Amir Ali Hajizadeh, commander of Aerospace Force of the Army of the Guardians of the Islamic Revolution. This was just a few days after news of the testing of a new-generation medium-range ballistic missile, the Emad, was broadcast by the state media of Iran. Amir Ali Hajizadeh stated that: "Iranian missiles of varying ranges are ready to be launched from underground bases once Supreme Leader Ayatollah Ali Khamenei orders to do so," adding that "Iran created missile bases in all the provinces and cities throughout the country at a depth of 500 meters."

Bases were again displayed on TV on January 5, 2016, amid heightened tensions with Saudi Arabia following the execution of Shi`ìte cleric Nimr al-Nimr. The second-in-command of the Revolutionary Guards boasted that Iran's depots and underground facilities were so full that it didn't know where to store new missiles.

Analysis
The release of the footage of the Iranian underground missile bases provided the situation for the lawmakers to show that the July nuclear deal had not weakened the military of Iran and it was a show of strength by Iran in response to the western powers, especially the US, speaking of military options against Iran in spite of the nuclear deal, according to The Guardian. Hajizadeh said that Iran was not seeking to start a war but "if enemies make a mistake, missile bases will erupt like a volcano from the depth of earth."

According to Tal Inbar a senior Israeli defense expert and head of the Space Research Center at the Fisher Institute for Air and Space Strategic Studies in Herzliya, this missile base "enables the Islamic Republic to store and covertly fire surface-to-surface missiles." He described the underground facility, whose location is unknown, as a "complex system of enormous tunnels". He also added that those bases could be used by Iran for "a surprise barrage missile attack".

List of coordinates of TEL or tunnel berms & mountain peaks 
 
(IRGC Aerospace Force) list of above ground missile bases

See also 
 List of Iranian Air Force bases
 Underground Great Wall of China
 Emad (missile)
 Missile Magazine System
 Eghtedar-e Velayat (war game)

References

External links 
 Video of Iranian underground missile base
 Pictures of Iranian underground missile base 

Military installations of Iran
Weapons of Iran
Ballistic missiles of Iran
Islamic Revolutionary Guard Corps